The 2013 Senate election in the Philippines occurred on May 13, 2013 to elect one-half of the Senate. The senators elected in 2013, together with those elected on 2010, will comprise the Senate's delegation in the 16th Congress.

The proclamation of all the 12 senators was done three days after Election Day, on May 16. all incumbents that ran successfully defended their seats, while all new senators were elected.

Manner of Election
Voting for senators is via nationwide, at-large basis via the plurality-at-large voting system. A voter has twelve votes: the voter can vote less than twelve but not more than it. These votes are tallied nationwide and the twelve candidates with the highest number of votes are elected to the Senate. The Commission on Elections administers elections for the Senate, with the Senate Electoral Tribunal deciding election disputes after a Senator has taken office.

Senators elected in 2013
Key: Boldface: incumbent, italicized: neophyte senator
*Senators are elected on a nationwide, at-large basis.

2013 Philippine general election